Nebojša Vučković (13 May 1949 – 13 May 2019) was a Serbian football manager and player.

Playing career
Vučković spent three seasons with Vojvodina in the Yugoslav First League between 1974 and 1977. He also played abroad in Austria and France in the late 1970s and early 1980s.

Managerial career
During the late 1990s and early 2000s, Vučković worked with the youth teams at Qadsia in Kuwait. He later served as manager of various other clubs in the Middle East, including Al-Ahli, Al-Sailiya and Ismaily.

Death
Vučković died on his 70th birthday in Belgrade after a long illness.

Honours
Al-Ahli
 Saudi Crown Prince Cup: 2006–07

References

External links
 
 

1949 births
2019 deaths
Footballers from Zagreb
Serbs of Croatia
Yugoslav footballers
Serbian footballers
Association football forwards
FK Vojvodina players
LASK players
FK Rad players
AS Béziers Hérault (football) players
Yugoslav First League players
Austrian Football Bundesliga players
Yugoslav Second League players
Ligue 2 players
Yugoslav expatriate footballers
Expatriate footballers in Austria
Expatriate footballers in France
Yugoslav expatriate sportspeople in Austria
Yugoslav expatriate sportspeople in France
Yugoslav football managers
Serbia and Montenegro football managers
Serbian football managers
Al-Wakrah SC managers
FK Bežanija managers
Al-Ahli Saudi FC managers
Al Kharaitiyat SC managers
Al-Sailiya SC managers
Ismaily SC managers
FK Donji Srem managers
Qatar Stars League managers
Saudi Professional League managers
Egyptian Premier League managers
Oman Professional League managers
Serbian SuperLiga managers
Serbia and Montenegro expatriate football managers
Serbian expatriate football managers
Expatriate football managers in Kuwait
Expatriate football managers in Qatar
Expatriate football managers in Saudi Arabia
Expatriate football managers in Egypt
Expatriate football managers in Oman
Serbia and Montenegro expatriate sportspeople in Qatar
Serbia and Montenegro expatriate sportspeople in Saudi Arabia
Serbian expatriate sportspeople in Saudi Arabia
Serbian expatriate sportspeople in Qatar
Serbian expatriate sportspeople in Egypt
Serbian expatriate sportspeople in Oman
Serbia and Montenegro expatriate sportspeople in Kuwait